Cheraghi Expressway, formerly Javaneh Expressway is a road system that starts from Navvab Expressway and Qale Morghi Expressway. It runs from beside Qale Morghi Airport and ends in Zam-zam Square in Tehran, Iran.

Expressways in Tehran